The Volkswagen Jetta (A5 or Mk5, codename 1K) is a compact car, the fifth generation of the Volkswagen Jetta and the successor to the Volkswagen Bora which was manufactured by Volkswagen between 2005 and 2010, and up to 2012 in China. It is a three-box sedan derivative of the Golf Mk5. It was marketed as the Volkswagen Bora in Mexico and Colombia, Volkswagen Vento in Argentina, Chile and Uruguay, and Volkswagen Sagitar in China.

Overview 

The fifth generation debuted at the Los Angeles Auto Show on 5 January 2005. After the New Beetle, it was the second Volkswagen product to make its world debut at a U.S. auto show. The Mark 5 sedan went on sale in the USA prior to any other country, reflecting the importance of the car in that market for Volkswagen. VW spent US$800 million to upgrade its Puebla facilities for this model's production. This included a US$290 million new engine production line for the 5-cylinder power plant, a US$50 million investment in the press shop, as well as a US$200 million purchase of 460 robots, which increased automation by 80%.

Although produced in the largest volumes in Mexico, final assembly of the car also takes place in China and South Africa for those respective markets. Like initial production of the second generation in China, the Asian and African plants build the car from a complete knock down (CKD) kit shipped from the factory in Puebla. Local assembly in Kaluga, Russia, started in early 2008. Assembly also began in India in 2008 at the Škoda factory in Aurangabad As with the previously mentioned assembly plants, CKD kits from Volkswagen de México will be used.

The A5 Jetta is  longer,  wider, and has a  longer wheelbase than the previous iteration. Interior room has increased from 2.46 cubic metres (87 cu ft) to 2.58 cubic metres (91 cu ft). Luggage compartment volume is up to 453 litres (16 cu ft). One major change is the introduction of the first multi-link independent rear suspension in a Jetta. The design of the rear suspension resembles the one found in the Ford Focus. Volkswagen reportedly hired engineers from Ford who designed the suspension on the Focus.

Styling reflects a new direction for the Volkswagen brand, with a new chrome front grille, first seen on the Golf Mk5 R32, which was trickled down to other models. Some critics appreciated the new styling, whilst others dismissed it as just as bland as the 4th generation.

For model year 2009, certain markets saw a new base model internal combustion engine and automatic transmission. The previous 2.0-litre four-cylinder engine and six-speed automatic transmission were replaced with a smaller, more powerful, and more fuel efficient, 1.4-litre turbocharged four-cylinder engine and six-speed DSG transmission (the same as used in the new Golf Mk5). In addition, acceleration times 0-100 km/h (0-62 mph) have improved, from 9.2 s to 8.5 s for the manual (an 8% improvement), and from 9.9 s to 8.5 s for the automatic (a 14% improvement).

Features
The body of the fifth generation used high strength steel and laser welding with 35% of its body parts, resulting in double-digit increases in both dynamic and torsional rigidity. An impact-absorbing front bumper which yields slightly in the event of a collision with a pedestrian, reducing the chance of injury. A new door design allows just the outer panel to be removed and replaced if damaged, rather than the entire door. Safety features included side curtain airbags, seat-mounted rear side airbags, Electronic Stability Programme with Anti-Slip Regulation and Brake assist, as well as active head restraints. A Direct-Shift Gearbox (DSG) transmission, available dual-zone automatic climate control, and electro-mechanical power steering were also available.

The fifth generation car features a redesigned electrical system. Control modules are used for various systems, digitally transmitted over Controller Area Network (CAN) buses at 500 kilobits per second — reducing the number of wires needed, and the opportunity for faults. Cars equipped with halogen headlamps have a 'VW' logo integrated into the bulb shield. In most markets, the rear lights use light-emitting diodes (LEDs). In North America, standard filament bulbs with a different design are used to comply with FMVSS 108.

Volkswagen has developed a very specific motor oil quality standard; oil meeting this standard must be used to ensure full warranty coverage.

Engines

The internal combustion engines available are dependent on the destination market. In Europe, a range of the new generation Fuel Stratified Injection (FSI) engines are available. Additionally in that market, the car can be had with an engine known as the 'Twincharger'. This 1.4 litre petrol engine combines turbo- and supercharging, to make a small but powerful engine with low fuel consumption. The Jetta available in the Americas and the Middle East is powered by a 2.5-litre 5-cylinder 20-valve engine in most trims. This engine shares its cylinder head design with the V10 engine found in the Lamborghini Gallardo and Audi R8.

When the Mark 5 Jetta was introduced, the Turbocharged Direct Injection (TDI) diesel engine was not offered in five U.S. States due to the tight emission standards promulgated by the California Air Resources Board. In addition to California, four other states adopted the more stringent California standards. Where it was available, it fell into the least-restrictive emission category. That category was removed in 2007, prompting the diesel Jetta to be unavailable for more than a year until the introduction of a new common rail diesel engine, which appeared in August 2008. The introduction was delayed for approximately six months due to technical issues with the new emissions control system. The TDI Clean Diesel engine is rated , and uses advanced features such as a diesel particulate filter and NOx-storage catalyst (vs. AdBlue) to reduce NOx in order to qualify as a Tier II Bin 5 vehicle (equivalent to California's LEV II rating), and thereby allowing it to be sold in all 50 U.S. states. AdBlue (urea injection fluid) is not required, further reducing maintenance requirements. In 2015 it was found that this engine's emissions had been falsified.

In the U.S., in August 2010, it was reported that the National Highway Traffic Safety Administration (NHTSA) was investigating 37,889 2009 Jetta TDI's regarding a stalling problem. There were complaints to the agency about the Jettas going into "limp-home" mode and then stalling almost immediately while being driven. Motor Trend reported that there were also complaints about premature failures of its high-pressure fuel pump.

Safety

In Insurance Institute for Highway Safety crash testing the Jetta received an overall "Good" rating in both front offset and side impact tests.  In the side impact test the Jetta received "Good" marks in all nine measured categories. In 2005, the Institute noted that the side impact protection performance was the best they had ever rated. In 2006, the car received a "Top Safety Pick" award from the Institute. The National Highway Traffic Safety Administration gave the fifth generation Jetta  for both driver and passenger protection in a frontal impact, while the car received  stars in a side impact crash test. To tout the safety of the car, a series of television commercials with the tag line "Safe happens" showed the car being involved in a collision whilst afterward the occupants are shown to have emerged unscathed.

The VW Jetta received the maximum 5 stars in the China NCAP crash tests.

Testing and review

The fifth generation received generally positive reviews with some reviewers complaining the car lost some of its character with the redesign. Most reviewers found the ride to be firm and well controlled but not always as forgiving as the previous generation. Handling was a strong point, with quick and precise steering and minimal body roll due to the MacPherson Strut suspension up front. Fit and finish received excellent marks, with reviewers noting the car felt very upscale. The front seats were firm but well liked, and the rear seat was roomy, in contrast to the cramped quarters in the fourth generation. Controls and displays were decent, but fell apart and started shorting out with age. Reviewers were particularly impressed with the "Sportline" models (known as the GLI in North America). Additionally, the 2.0 Turbo FSI engine also won commendation for its high power figures, smooth operation, and low fuel consumption. Along with its hatchback brethren, the fifth generation ranks among the top cars on the market in independent reviews of resale value.

Although improved over the fourth generation, the Mark 5 still took over 42 hours to assemble at the factory in Mexico. Part of this disparity is blamed on the switch to the more complex independent rear suspension. Volkswagen has publicly stated its discontent over the excessive assembly time, and pledged to streamline manufacturing in the next generation of A platform cars. In the interim, Volkswagen de México is making a concerted effort to further increase productivity at the plant by consulting outside experts from Toyota and other Japanese companies. By implementing many lean manufacturing principles and techniques, a goal has been set to increase productivity levels at the factory by 30% or more in the coming years.

Engine specifications

Golf Variant/Jetta SportWagen

VW marketed the station wagon as the Jetta SportWagen in the United States, Bora Sportwagen in Mexico, Golf Break and later Golf SW in France, Jetta Variant in Brazil, Vento Variant in Argentina, Jetta Wagon in Canada (2009 only), Golf Wagon in Canada (2010 onwards), Golf Estate in the United Kingdom and Golf Variant in the German domestic and most other markets.

In 2010, the Sportwagen received a minor interior and exterior facelift, and remained based on the fifth-generation Golf, with front end styling mirroring the sixth-generation Golf.

2010 Jetta TDI Cup "Street" edition
This version commemorated the 2008+ Jetta TDI Cup Race series, the last year of the Mk V, and was based on the TDI Clean Diesel sedan. Additional upgrades from the base TDI were "TDI Cup Edition" body side stickers, 18 inch wheels with Pirelli P-Zero or Yokohama ADVAN 225/40R18 sport tires, aluminum pedals, leather-wrapped steering wheel, chrome door linings, aerodynamic body kit (front, side & rear), an Interlagos cloth interior with heated sport seats, short shifter, faux carbon fiber inlays (as opposed to metallic), and a black interior (headliner/doorcards/dash).

It could be purchased with either a 6-speed Manual or DSG transmission (DSG includes paddle shifters), and a "Thunderbunny" body kit was optional (and available from VW only on the Cup edition).

The vehicle was unveiled in the 2008 SEMA Show. The production version went on sale in January 2010 with a base MSRP of US$24,990 (not including destination fee or options).

Per VW North America, worldwide only 1,501 Jetta TDI Cup Editions were produced. 588 were manufactured with a manual transmission and 913 were built with DSG transmissions.

References

Compact cars
Euro NCAP small family cars
Front-wheel-drive vehicles
Sedans
Cars introduced in 2005
2010s cars
Jetta 5